Dulal Bhuiyan is an Indian politician and member of the Jharkhand Mukti Morcha. Bhuiyan is a member of the Jharkhand Legislative Assembly from the Jugsalai constituency in East Singhbhum district in 1995, 2000 and 2005, and also a minister in Jharkhand Government in 2005-2009.

References 

People from East Singhbhum district
Jharkhand Mukti Morcha politicians
Members of the Jharkhand Legislative Assembly
Living people
21st-century Indian politicians
Year of birth missing (living people)
Jharkhand MLAs 2005–2009